Mohammed Buba Marwa   (born 9 September 1953), is a retired Nigerian army brigadier general, who has served as Chairman of the National Drug Law Enforcement Agency (NDLEA) since January 2021. He previously served as governor of Lagos State from 1996 to 1999 during the military regime of Generals Sani Abacha and Abdulsalami Abubakar and governor of Borno State from 1990 to 1992 during the military regime of General Ibrahim Babangida.

Early life and education
Marwa was born on 9 September 1953 in Kaduna, Northern Nigeria to a scion of military family, his father, Buba Marwa, and grandfather, Buba Yola, had served in the Nigeria Army, and Marwa did not deviate from that path. He had his primary school education across Nigeria in Enugu, Zaria, Abeokuta and Lagos (1960–1965) and went on to attend the Nigerian Military School (NMS), Zaria (1966–1970). Subsequently, he completed a regular combatant course at the Nigerian Defence Academy (NDA) and was commissioned into Nigeria Army Recce Corps (NARC) in June 1973.

Military career

He was commissioned as 2nd lieutenant in the Nigerian Army Reconnaissance Corps before moving to the Armoured Corp. He held various posts in the army, including Brigade Major (23 Armoured Brigade), Aide-de-Camp (ADC) to Chief of Army Staff, Lieutenant-General Theophilus Danjuma, academic registrar of the Nigerian Defense Academy and deputy defense adviser in the Nigerian Embassy in Washington, DC.
In 1990, he was appointed Governor of Borno State. In 1992, he became the defense adviser to the Nigerian Permanent Mission to the United Nations. He attended several trainings in Nigeria and abroad, such as:

●      Communication Instructors course, School of Armour Nowshera, Pakistan.

●      Regimental Signal Officers (RSO) course, Nigerian Army Signals School, Apapa.

●      RSO (All Arms), Military College of Telecommunication Engineering, Mhow, India.

●      Armour Officer Basic Course, Fort Knox, Kentucky, USA.

●      Advanced Armour Officers Course in the Armoured Corps Centre and School, Ahmadnagar, India.

●      Junior and Senior Staff College courses at Command and Staff College (CSC), Jaji.

Academic qualifications 

General Marwa has two postgraduate degrees, namely Master of Public and International Affairs from the University of Pittsburgh (1983-85) and Master of Public Administration from Harvard (1985-86).

His other qualifications include certificates in International Security Studies, Leadership and Organisational Innovation and Project Planning and Evaluation (PPE).

Public administration 
He has held several command and staff appointments in the Nigeria Army, including Deputy Defense Adviser at the Nigerian Embassy in Washington DC. By and large, he is renowned for his public administration acumen.

Appointed Military Governor of old Borno State (present Borno and Yobe states) from June 1990 to 1992, his administration had a far-reaching impact on the populace in diverse ways including in health care delivery, education and agriculture. Marwa created the first Ministry of Water Resources and by direct labour, the state undertook the construction of roads and completed the Maiduguri International Hotel.

The appointment of Gen Marwa as the administrator of Borno State coincided with the time Idriss Deby, erstwhile rebel, seized power from President Hisen Habre, thereby dislodging members of the Chadian Army, some of who went rogue and carried out raids across the border into Borno State. The marauders' pillaging of towns, villages and communities, was not unlike Boko Haram’s.

In 1992, Gen Marwa was posted as Registrar of the Nigerian Defence Academy. And in 1993, he returned to foreign service as Defence Attache at the Mission of Nigeria to the United Nations in New York.

In August 1996, he was appointed Military Administrator of Lagos State. His three-year tenure in the state was accompanied by strategic programmes. The feats were achieved on a strict budget of N14billion. Marwa, who did not borrow from any bank throughout his tenure, handed over a cash amount of N2billion―the highest amount handed over from one state administration to another. 

His exemplary leadership earned him “Nigeria’s Man of the Year 1997” by Newswatch, Nigeria’ oldest and influential weekly magazine.

Lagos State Governor 

From 1996 to 1999 Marwa was Military Governor of Lagos State. During his administration, he implemented programs such as "Operation 250 Roads" which greatly improved motoring conditions.
He revamped public health institutions, and ensured that free malaria treatment that was available to all. His administration upgraded infrastructure in poor neighborhoods. He proclaimed an edict to regulate rents, stopping the "Jankara" method of eviction of tenants and ensuring that due process was followed.
Marwa became well respected in Lagos because of "Operation Sweep", a joint police and military venture that helped reduce Lagos' notorious crime rate.

In February 1998, Buba  Marwa said on Nigerian state radio and television that unknown persons were again trying to assassinate him, and that he and his entourage had been the target of several bomb attacks starting in 1996. He said that he would not be intimidated.

In May 1998, Mohammed Buba Marwa imposed fuel rationing in Lagos State in an attempt to tackle petrol shortages and reduce chronic queuing at petrol stations. 
In July 1998, Marwa opened a new asphalt plant in Lagos, the largest in Nigeria.

Awards and honours 
●      National Honour

2003―Officer of the Order of the Federal Republic (OFR)       

2022―Commander of the Order of the Niger (CON) 

●      Nigerian Armed Forces Honour

1998―Distinguished Service Star (DSS)                                               

●      Academic Awards

 Doctor of Science (Honoris Causa), Abubakar Tafawa Balewa University, Bauchi                   
 Doctor of Public Administration (Honoris Causa),  University of Nigeria, Nsukka (UNN)                                
 Doctor of Management Technology (Honoris Causa) Federal University of Technology, Owerri                  
 2003 Outstanding Leadership Award by the Centre For Multicultural Leadership University of Kansas, Lawrence.  First African honoured by the

Institute in its ten years of inaugurating the award. Reciprocating, General Marwa endowed an annual “Marwa Africana Lecture Series” in the Department of African and Afro- American Studies. The late Prof Ali Mazrui presented the inaugural lecture.

●      FELLOWSHIPS

Marwa is a Fellow of many prestigious institutes including:

●      Institute of Aviation Management (FIAM)

●      Chartered Institute of Local Government and Public Administration of Nigeria (FCILGPA)               

●      Fellow: Chemical Society of Nigeria (FCSN)          

●      Fellow: Institute of Transport Administration of Nigeria (FInstTA)

●      Fellow: Nigerian Institute of Marketing (FNMA)

●      Fellow: Chartered Institute of Logistics and Transport, London (FCILT)

●      Other Awards

A recipient of Gold Merit Award from the Nigerian Society of Engineers (NSE) and Nigerian Labour Congress (NLC), Marwa is Grand Patron of the Nigerian Youth Association and also Nigeria Maltese Business Council.

His leadership acumen has been recognised with various awards such as the Zik Award for Political Leadership, Kwame Nkrumah Leadership Award (Ghana),  and Outstanding Leadership Award by the Joint Youth Association of Nigeria.

He also has in his kitty Shehu Musa Yar’Adua Memorial Foundation’s Outstanding Corporate Citizen Award, Millenium Award by Youths Sports Federation of Nigeria (YSFON) and National Distinguished Merit Award in Transportation from the Centre for Transport Studies, among others. Marwa, 2003 Diversity Speaker at the College of Business Studies, Kansas State University, Manhattan, Kansas, and winner of the First WOTCLEF Merit Award, is Patron of the Nigerian Union of Journalists (NUJ, Oyo State Council) and Grand Patron, All Africa Students’ Union (AASU).

References

1953 births
Nigerian Army officers
Living people
Nigerian Muslims
People from Kaduna
University of Pittsburgh alumni
Harvard Kennedy School alumni
Governors of Borno State
Governors of Lagos State
Nigerian Military School alumni